Nyo Min Lu is a Burmese writer known for mostly writing short stories and translating others' work. He had written over 2000 articles and short novels.

Early life and education 
Nyo Min Lu was born in Sagaing Region, on 14 October 1953 and raised by his father, Tin Tun and his mother, Daw Tin Nyunt. He was their only son.

Career
He started as a business journalist working in the early 1990s for such magazines as Dana, Myanma Dana and Living Colour, with colleagues who included Sue Hnget, Nay Win Myint and Mg Ko Ko (Amarapura), writers who began their careers in business reporting.

Literature awards
Cats and Cats short novel (2001, The Htan  Yaite  Nyo literature  Award)
The Ngo Ya Thu (2007 Children's Literature Award in Kale)
Yotekasoe, other short novels and collected short novel ( 2008 Taw Phyar Lay Literature Award)
The Mekong Myanmar  Literature Award 2015

Personal life
On May 30, 2008, he married Mi Mi Thaw.

References 

1953 births
Burmese writers
People from Sagaing Region
Living people